Myron Fink (born April 19, 1932) is a Chicago-born composer of opera and other pieces for voice, piano, and chamber ensemble. His compositions have been performed around the world.  The Sousa Archives and Center for American Music holds the Myron Fink Music Collection, 1961–2008.

Operas
1954 The Boor
1956 Susanna and the Elders
1961 Jeremiah
1969 Judith and Holofernes 
1981 Chinchilla
1985 The Island of Tomorrow
1997 The Conquistador
2000 Animalopera
2003 Edith Wharton: A self portrait

References

American male classical composers
American classical composers
1932 births
Living people
American opera composers
Male opera composers
Musicians from Chicago
20th-century classical composers
21st-century classical composers
21st-century American composers
20th-century American composers
Classical musicians from Illinois
20th-century American male musicians
21st-century American male musicians